Mario Reilly (born 15 May 1905, date of death unknown) was an Argentine boxer who competed in the 1924 Summer Olympics. In 1924 he was eliminated in the first round of the lightweight class after losing his fight to Vicente Valdero.

References

External links
profile

1905 births
Year of death missing
Lightweight boxers
Olympic boxers of Argentina
Boxers at the 1924 Summer Olympics
Argentine people of Irish descent
Argentine male boxers